Paul Hunter (born 30 August 1968) is a Scottish former professional footballer who played as a forward for East Fife (1984–89, 1994–95), Hull City (1989–93), Cowdenbeath (1993–94) and Stenhousemuir (1995–99). He played for Scotland under-20s in the 1987 FIFA World Youth Championship.

Honours

Player
Stenhousemuir
Scottish Challenge Cup 1995–96

References

1968 births
Living people
Footballers from Kirkcaldy
Association football forwards
Scottish footballers
East Fife F.C. players
Hull City A.F.C. players
Cowdenbeath F.C. players
Stenhousemuir F.C. players
Scottish Football League players
English Football League players
Scotland under-21 international footballers